Urmur Bile Trax Volume 1 & 2 is a 1997 double EP by British electronic musician Mike Paradinas under his main moniker μ-ziq. Track 06 ("1 Hip 007") is a remix of "Phi * 1700 (U/V)" from the first µ-Ziq album Tango n' Vectif. Track 08 ("The Phonic Socks") is a remix of "The Sonic Fox", also from the first album.

Track listing
 "Urmur Bile" - 9.09
 "Let Let" - 7.12
 "M5 Saabtone" - 10.08
 "Fine Tuning" - 6.14
 "The Hydrozone" - 6.18
 "1 Hip 007" - 12.52
 "Hornet" - 8.41
 "The Phonic Socks" - 7.05

References

Mike Paradinas albums
1997 EPs